Composed in Syriac in northern Mesopotamia, the Syriac Alexander Legend, also known as the Neṣḥānā ("triumph"), is a legendary account of the exploits of Alexander the Great. It is independent of the Alexander Romance and served as a source for apocalyptic literature in the 7th century. It is the earliest work to mention the fusion of Alexander's gate with the Biblical apocalyptic tradition of Gog and Magog.

Dating 

The composition of the Legend is commonly attributed to north Mesopotamia around 629–630 CE, shortly after Heraclius defeated the Sasanians. However, some have argued that the Syriac recension was originally produced in an earlier form in the early 6th century and was updated in the early 7th century in light of then-contemporary apocalyptic themes. Another position taken up by some scholars is that the text was composed around the Byzantine-Sassanid events surrounding the year 614. There is also a poem (often wrongly attributed to Jacob of Serugh) based on the Syriac Legend but written slightly later. Finally, there is a shorter version of the Legend and an original brief biography of Alexander written in Syriac.

Content and influence

Gog and Magog 

The Legend is considered the first work to connect the Alexander Gates with the idea that Gog and Magog are destined to play a role in the apocalypse. In the Legend, Gog (gwg) and Magog (ܵ, mgwg) appear as kings of Hunnish nations. The legend claims that Alexander carved prophecies on the face of the Gate, marking a date for when these Huns, consisting of 24 nations, will breach the Gate and subjugate the greater part of the world.

The Gog and Magog material, which passed into a lost Arabic version, and the Ethiopic and later Oriental versions of the Alexander Romance. It has also been found to closely resemble the story of Dhu al-Qarnayn in the Qur'an (see: Alexander the Great in the Quran).

The Pseudo-Methodius, written originally in Syriac, is considered the source of the Gog and Magog tale incorporated into Western versions of the Alexander Romance. The Pseudo-Methodius (7th century) is the first source in the Christian tradition for a new element: two mountains moving together to narrow the corridor, which was then sealed with a gate against Gog and Magog. This idea is also in the Quran  and found its way in the Western Alexander Romance.

Western Alexander romances

This Gog and Magog legend is not found in earlier versions of the Alexander Romance of Pseudo-Callisthenes, whose oldest manuscript dates to the 3rd century, but an interpolation into recensions around the 8th century. In the latest and longest Greek version are described the Unclean Nations, which include the Goth and Magoth as their kings, and whose people engage in the habit of eating worms, dogs, human cadavers and fetuses. They were allied to Belsyrians (Bebrykes, of Bithynia in modern-day North Turkey), and sealed beyond the "Breasts of the North", a pair of mountains fifty days' march away towards the north.

Gog and Magog appear in somewhat later Old French versions of the romance. In the verse Roman d'Alexandre, Branch III, of Lambert le Tort (c. 1170), Gog and Magog ("Gos et Margos", "Got et Margot") were vassals to Porus, king of India, providing an auxiliary force of 400,000 men. Routed by Alexander, they escaped through a defile in the mountains of Tus (or Turs), and were sealed by the wall erected there, to last until the advent of the Antichrist. Branch IV of the poetic cycle tells that the task of guarding Gog and Magog, as well as the rule of Syria and Persia was assigned to Antigonus, one of Alexander's successors.

See also
Gates of Alexander
Letters of Alexander the Great

Notes

References

Sources

Further reading 

 
 
 

Alexander the Great in legend
Alexander Legend
7th-century Christian texts
Christian apocalyptic writings